Muraidhoo (Dhivehi: މުރައިދޫ) is one of the inhabited islands of  Haa Alif Atoll administrative division and is geographically part of Thiladhummathi Atoll in the north of the Maldives. It is an island-level administrative constituency governed by the Muraidhoo Island Council.  It is one of the intra-atoll islands (i.e. not forming the atoll border).

History
There are no archaeological remains of interest on the island. Notable figures from Muraidhoo include Hassan Kaleyge who served as the Treasurer of the Kings for many sultans of the Isdhoo and Dhiyamigili Dynastries and Hussein Dahara Takurufan who was the foreign minister during Sultan Ghazi Hassan Izudeen's reign 1759–1767.

Geography

Demography

References

External links
Isles: Muraidhoo

Islands of the Maldives